The 2003 Euro Beach Soccer Cup was the fifth Euro Beach Soccer Cup. Held in April 2003, it was one of Europe's two major beach soccer championships at the time in Liège, Belgium.
Portugal won the championship, claiming their third successive title and fourth overall, with France finishing second. This was the first time the final was not between Portugal and Spain since the tournament was established in 1998. Spain beat Germany in the third place playoff to finish third and fourth respectively. This was the first time the host nation had not featured in the top four places.

Eight teams participated in the tournament who played in a straightforward knockout tournament, starting with the quarterfinals, with extra matches deciding the nations who finished in fifth, sixth, seventh and eighth place.

Participating nations

Matches

Main tournament

Fifth to eighth place deciding matches
The following matches took place between the losing nations in the quarterfinals to determine the final standings of the nations finishing in fifth to eighth place. The semifinals occurred on the same day of the semifinals of the main tournament and the playoffs took place on the day of the final.

Winners

Final standings

References

Euro Beach Soccer Cup
2003 in beach soccer